Amethu called Ahmose was a vizier of ancient Egypt. He served during the reign of Thutmose II and the early years of the reign of Hatshepsut and Thutmose III of the 18th Dynasty.

Family
His wife's name was Ta-Amethu. Their children include the viziers Useramen and Neferweben. Two additional sons are known from Theban tomb TT122: Amenhotep, an Overseer of the Magazine of Amun, and Akheperkare, a prophet of Montu.

Amethu called Ahmose and his wife Ta-Amethu also had several grandchildren. The later second prophet of Amun Merymaat was a son of Amenhotep. Vizier Rekhmire was a son of Neferweben.

Tombs and burial
Amethu called Ahmose was buried in TT83 in Sheikh Abd el-Qurna, Thebes.

References

Viziers of the Eighteenth Dynasty of Egypt